Stephanie Marrian (born Stefanie Khan; 9 October 1948) is a former model, pop star and actress. She was the first Page 3 model in The Sun newspaper.

Modelling career
Marrian was the first Page 3 model in The Sun newspaper in the 17 November 1970 edition, where she was named as Stephanie Rahn. Marrian was using her father's surname of Khan at the time; a subeditor at the newspaper misread her surname as Rahn. From 1973 to 1978, using the name Stefanie Marrian, her mother's surname, she appeared regularly as the Page 3 girl. In this role she was featured in the 2017 stage production of Ink, played by Pearl Chanda and directed by Rupert Goold, at the Almeida Theatre, London.

Marrian was a glamour model throughout the 1970s, appearing topless and nude in magazines, papers and calendars world-wide. Along with two other Page Three models, Gillian Duxbury and Mona Solomons, she was a member of a pop group called Page Three.

Family and personal life
Marrian was born in Singapore to an Indian father and an English mother; other sources erroneously stated that she was German and her birth surname was Rahn.

Television and film appearances
British TV programmes include:
 as Cross's girl in Callan (1970)
 as a student in Some Mothers Do 'Ave 'Em (1973)
 The Cut Price Comedy Show (1982)

Films include:
 as Susan in Confessions Of A Sex Maniac (1974), starring Roger Lloyd-Pack
 as Lesley in Can You Keep It Up for a Week? (1974), starring Jeremy Bulloch
 as Girl in Hotel in The World Is Full of Married Men (1979)
 as Lady Marie in the Mel Brooks film History of the World, Part I (1981)
 as Hotel Receptionist in Green Ice (1981), starring Ryan O'Neal

References

External links
 

1948 births
Living people
Page 3 girls
English female models
English people of Indian descent
Singaporean emigrants to the United Kingdom